Duboko may refer to the following villages:
 Duboko, Bosnia and Herzegovina
 Duboko, Ljubovija in the Mačva District of Serbia
 Duboko, Užice in the Zlatibor District of Serbia